The 2019 Vuelta a Asturias was the 62nd edition of the Vuelta a Asturias road cycling stage race, which was held from 3 May to 5 May 2019. The race started and finished in Oviedo.

General classification

References

Vuelta Asturias
2019 in road cycling
2019 in Spanish sport